Kan Zaw (born 11 October 1954) is the current Union Minister for Ministry of Investment and Foreign Economic Relations. He previously served as Union Auditor General under Min Aung Hlaing. He was the Minister for National Planning and Economic Development of Myanmar from September 2012 to March 2016. From March 2011 to September 2012, he served as its deputy minister.

Early life and education 
Kan Zaw was born on 11 October 1954 in Salin Township, Magwe Division, Burma (now Magwe Region, Myanmar). He received a Bachelor of Economics at the Yangon Institute of Economics, and graduated from the International Institute of Social Studies in 1984 from a Master of Art in Regional Development Planning. Kan Zaw also holds a Doctorate in Literature.

Career 
Kan Zaw has had a long career with the Yangon Institute of Economics, having served as a professor, department head and ultimately as rector. 

In February 2021, in the aftermath of the 2021 Myanmar coup d'état, the military junta, the State Administration Council, appointed Kan Zaw as Union Auditor General, replacing Maw Than. After accepting the military appointment, Kan Zaw's family became the target of a social punishment campaign. In November 2021, the ASEAN Federation of Accountants (AFA) conference courted controversy for inviting Kan Zaw as a "guest of honour." In response, several accounting bodies, including the Institute of Management Accountants and Japanese Institute of Certified Public Accountants withdrew from the conference.

In November 2022, the European Union imposed sanctions on Kan Zaw as part of a targeted economic and travel sanction effort on Burmese junta officials.

Personal life
Kan Zaw is married, and has three children, including Khine Ngwe Hnin Zaw.

References

Government ministers of Myanmar
Living people
1954 births
Burmese economists